Bruce Armand Boisclair (born December 9, 1952) is a former American Major League Baseball outfielder, who spent his entire major league career with the New York Mets from  to .

Boisclair attended Killingly High School in Killingly, Connecticut, where he starred in football, basketball & baseball. In fact, before being drafted by the New York Mets in the 20th round of the 1970 Major League Baseball Draft, the tight end was expected to attend Boston College on a football scholarship.

After five seasons in their farm system, where he batted .277 with twelve home runs and 150 runs batted in, Boisclair received a September call-up from the Mets in 1974. In a 25 inning marathon with the St. Louis Cardinals at Shea Stadium, Boisclar made his major league debut in the 23rd inning, pinch running for Duffy Dyer. He batted .250 with one RBI (against the Philadelphia Phillies) over the remainder of the season.

He failed to make the big league club out of Spring training , and was assigned to the triple A Tidewater Tides, where he spent the entire season. He performed admirably in that role, batting .287 with two home runs & thirteen RBIs. He had a stellar .571 batting average & one home run as a pinch hitter.

He began the season platooning with right-handed free agent acquisition Elliott Maddox in right field, and hit a two run home run in his first start of the season. However, he batted just .222 in April, and soon found himself back in his familiar reserve role.

He missed half of the 1979 season due to a wrist injury, and batted just .163 upon his return. He was released during spring training of 1980, and signed with the Hanshin Tigers for the 1980 season. He batted .246 with eight home runs and 26 RBIs in his only season in Japan.

Career stats

He batted .286 with two home runs, twelve RBIs and a .444 slugging percentage as a pinch hitter.

References

External links
, or The Ultimate Mets Database

1952 births
Living people
Major League Baseball outfielders
Baseball players from Connecticut
New York Mets players
Hanshin Tigers players
Marion Mets players
Memphis Blues players
Tidewater Tides players
Pompano Beach Mets players
American expatriate baseball players in Japan
Visalia Mets players